Anthiyur is a taluk (Anthiyur taluk) and panchayat town in the Erode district in the state of Tamil Nadu, India.

Geography
It is located at about 18 km from Bhavani, 30 km from Erode, 65 km from Tiruppur and 93.7 km from Coimbatore.

Climate
The temperature is moderate throughout the year except during summer. Rainfall is moderate to high, uncertain and not well distributed. It is warm for most of the year. The city is not windy but the abundance of trees and vegetation surrounding the city makes its climate pleasant.

Economy
Anthiyur is known for betel leaves, agriculture products including cotton, ground nut known as kadalai, sugarcane, cassava (known as kuchikilangu), corn (makkacholam), and textile garments. It has a large weekly markets in Tamil Nadu which assembles every Monday.

Horse fair              
A horse fair (Kuthirai Santhai) is organized at the time of Sri Gurunatha Swamy temple festival in the Tamil month Aadi. Hundreds of horses of various breeds are exhibited in this fair. Other than horses, other domestic animals like cows, buffaloes, dogs and birds are also exhibited during the fair. The fair takes place for 5 to 6 days and it is witnessed by lakhs of people including farmers, pet enthusiasts and common people. Anthiyur horse fair is said to be organized right from the time of rule of Tipu Sultan.

Transport
Anthiyur is well connected by roads with Gobichettipalayam and Sathyamangalam via Athani (Tamil Nadu), Erode via Bhavani. Tamil Nadu State Transport Corporation has a depot apart from a central bus stand in Anthiyur. The nearest railway station is Erode Junction (32 km), a major railway station from where trains ply to all over the country. The nearest airport is Coimbatore International Airport (100 km).

Neighborhoods
Bhavani
Ammapettai
Sathyamangalam
Jambai
Paruvatchi
Ooratchikottai
Komarapalayam
Lakshmi Nagar
Bhavanisagar
Appakudal

References 

Cities and towns in Erode district